"Dúlamán" (Irish for "channel wrack", a type of edible seaweed) is an Irish folk song.

The lyrics of the song relate to the Irish practice of gathering seaweed, which has been done for various purposes, including as fertilizer, bathing, and food.

The song title was used in 2016 as name of an Irish music and dance show called , which competed in the finals of the German talent show Das Supertalent in 2017.

References

External links

1976 Clannad lyrics
1993 Altan lyrics
1993 Lyrics with phonetic spellings.
Review and history of the song.

Irish folk songs
Irish-language songs